Phaea signaticornis is a species of beetle in the family Cerambycidae. It was described by Melzer in 1932. It is known from Costa Rica.

References

signaticornis
Beetles described in 1932